Savant Lake is a lake in the northwestern portion of Thunder Bay District, Ontario, Canada.

See also
List of lakes of Ontario

References
 National Resources Canada

Lakes of Thunder Bay District